Rottin ta da Core is the first and only studio album by American rap group Rottin Razkals. It was released on March 14, 1995 through Illtown/Mad Sounds Recordings and was produced by the group's mentors, Naughty by Nature. The album managed to make it to three different Billboard charts, #190 on the Billboard 200, #28 on the Top R&B/Hip-Hop Albums and #14 on the Top Heatseekers and featured two charting singles. "Hey Alright" made it to #74 on the Hot R&B/Hip-Hop Singles & Tracks and #23 on the Hot Rap Singles, while "Oh Yeah" made it to #63 on the Hot R&B/Hip-Hop Singles & Tracks and #14 on the Hot Rap Singles chart.

Track listing
"Intro"- 1:36
"Batter Up"- 5:03 (featuring Bad News, Headache, Road Dawgs, Steel Handler & Treach)
"Oh Yeah"- 3:23
"Frustration"- 4:00 (featuring Cruddy Click & Road Dawgs)
"A-Yo"- 3:31
"Hey Alright"- 4:18
"Lik' a Shot"- 4:07 (featuring Black, Cruddy Click, Dueja, Headache, Road Dawgs & Supreme C)
"One Time for Ya Mind"- 4:00
"Get up, Stand Up"- 3:08
"Life of Bastard"- 2:51 (featuring Treach)
"Homiez Niggas"- 3:46
"Come on Y'all"- 3:33

Sample credits
"Batter Up"
"Klickow Klickow" by Naughty by Nature, Rottin Razkals, Cruddy Click and Road Dawgs
"Oh Yeah"
"Say Yeah" by the Commodores
"Fantastic Freaks at the Amphitheater"
"A-Yo!"
"Tobacco Road" by Brother Jack McDuff
"N.T." by Kool & the Gang
"Hey Alright"
"Caravan of Love" by Isley-Jasper-Isley
"You Ain't Really Down" by Status IV
"Lik' a Shot"
"And All Hell Broke Loose" by Willie Hutch
"One Time for Ya Mind"
"Forty Nine Reasons" by Julius Brockington and the Magic Horse
"Get Up, Stand Up"
"Fourth Movement: Passacaglia" by Yusef Lateef
"Check the Rhime" by A Tribe Called Quest
"Life of a Bastard"
"I Could Be Falling In Love" by Syl Johnson
"Why Can't People Be Colors Too?" by The Whatnauts
"Today" by Tom Scott
"Homiez Niggaz"
"What Would I Do If I Could Feel?" by Nipsey Russell
"Come on Y'all"
"How Do You View You" by Funkadelic

Chart history

References

External links

1995 debut albums
Motown albums